Dominique Regef (b. Paris, 1947) is a French improvisor, composer, and musician specializing in stringed instruments: the cello, the rebec, the vièle à archet, and the Rajasthan dilruba. Dominique Regef is recognized as an exceptional soloist on the hurdy-gurdy; he is known for surprising and moving audiences with his sound on the instrument. His concerts, be it a solo recital or a small group performance, shock listeners from all over the world with their originality and their strength. He has performed in several well-known music festivals, including the International Baroque Music Festival, the Jazz à Luz festival and the Grenoble Jazz Festival. He is cited as one of the best examples of modern hurdy-gurdy playing.

His interest in contemporary and improvised music was confirmed after long experimentation and contribution in the world of classical, medieval and traditional music. His first instruments were classical cello and piano. His more traditional work followed a cyclical and organic logic. It made use of the element of brute strength and sonority as an essential part of his musical conversations. In reviews of his solo album, Eight Magazine claimed that Regef has "transformed an instrument of antiquity into something utterly contemporary," while the Wire remarked that he "creates an intense soundscape of whirling strings, buzzing drones, and strident polyphonic effects akin to an electronic keyboard."

Collaborations 
Dominique Regef has collaborated with the following artists: Michel Doneda, Lê Quan Ninh, Daunik Lazro, Beñat Achiary, Evan Parker, Joëlle Léandre, Equidad Bares, Pascal Contet, Carlos Zingaro, Otomo Yoshihide, Bob Ostertag, Jon Rose, Francès Marie Uitti, Jean-Marc Montera, Rosina de Pèira, Mighela Cesari, Philippe Maté, Rémy Walter, Jean-François Méchali, Michel Marre, Jacques Di Donato, Didier Petit, Gérard Zuchetto, Stephan Eicher, Steve Waring, Pierre Jodlowsky and György Kurtag Junior, among others 

He has also worked with the following choreographers: Michel Raji, Emmanuel Grivet, Heddy Maalem and Marceline Lartigue, among others.

Finally, he has worked with the following poets and playwrights : Serge Pey, Thierry Bédart, Anne Lefèvre, Denis Podalydès and Peter Brook, among others.

Discography

Solo Album 
1993:Tourneries

Collaborations 
1970: Special Instrumental Guitar, with Steve Waring
1979: Le Bestiaire, with Malicorne
1979: Un bal Renaissance, with Mélusine and La Maurache
1988: Chemins Ibériques, with Equidad Bares
1988: Musique liturgique et profane du XIV siècle, with Toulouse Medieval Ensemble
1988: Arranoa, with Beñat Achiary
1991: Trobar e cantar, with Gérard Zuchetto
1991: Lili Purprea, with Beñat Achiary
1992: L'élémentaire sonore, with Michel Doneda
1992: SOC, with Michel Doneda and Lê Quan Ninh
1993: Anuèit, with Rosina de Pèira
1993: U cantu prufondu, with Mighela Cesari
1993: Kaskasnikola, with Ziskakan
1993: Carcassonne, with Stephan Eicher
1994: Non ci badar...guarda et passa, with Stephan Eicher
1994: Face to the Ground, with Rémy Walter
1994: L'ampleur des dégâts, with Eric Lareine
1995: Ballade pour une mer qui chante Vol.2, with Les Vents D'Est
1995: L'évangile du serpent, with Serge Pey
1996: La symphonnie indien, with Mythia - Ravi Prasad
1996: Système Friche
1998: Emotions, with Philippe Matté
2000: Concept, with Troubadours Art Ensemble
2000: Trob'art, with Troubadours Art Ensemble
2000: Open the Door, with Rodger Hodson
2001: Concepts 2, with Troubadours Art Ensemble
2001: OCCITANIA
2001: Indians Gavachs, with Michel Marre
2001: Renaissance, with Philippe Eidel
2002: Douce Amie - Chansons de Trouvères, with Millenarium
2003: Trobada, with Trobada

See also 
Valentin Clastrier
French folk music
Music of Limousin

References

External links 

Dominique Regef
Dominique Regef audio samples
Official site (French)
Dominique Regef - Discographie

French folk music
1947 births
Hurdy-gurdy players
Living people
Musicians from Paris